Ein Fall für zwei ("A case for two") is a German television series, which premiered on 11 September 1981 on ZDF. The series, set in Frankfurt am Main, features two main characters who solve crimes: a defense attorney and a private investigator.

Josef Matula (played by Claus Theo Gärtner), a former German police officer, has gone into private business. His method of investigation is very effective and direct, and he sometimes even resorts to dirty tricks. Claus Theo Gärtner portrayed the role until 2013.  The series' original opening theme sequence showed the viewer that Matula had been fired from the police and tried or convicted. Dr. Renz has defended him and Matula is seen walking out of the jail accompanied by Renz. Before closing we see that Renz has hired Matula as a private detective.

In contrast, the attorney character has changed several times. The first attorney was Dr. Dieter Renz (played by Günter Strack). Dr. Renz retired in episode #60 and was replaced by Dr. Rainer Franck (played by Rainer Hunold). In episode #149, Dr. Franck took a job as a law school teacher, and was replaced by Dr. Johannes Voss (played by Mathias Herrmann). In episode #182, Dr. Voss was shot dead by an escaping criminal, and was in turn replaced by Dr. Markus Lessing (played by Paul Frielinghaus).

Most of the episodes follow a simple pattern. Someone is murdered, and the police arrest the most likely suspect. The suspect, claiming to be innocent, hires the attorney in the series (Renz, Franck, Voss or Lessing) as his lawyer. The attorney does all the paperwork, talks with the police and attends court. Meanwhile, Matula does all the actual research and detective work - "gets his hands dirty", so to speak. Matula often gets into fights, and even though he is in his early sixties, he often knocks out the bad guys. In the end, the original suspect usually (but not always) turns out to be innocent after all, and the real culprit is found.

In late 2006 through early 2007, most episodes included scenes of Matula visiting a strip club, to interrogate the owner or one of the customers, with very brief footage of topless female dancers. Very few, if any, other German detective shows feature similar scenes. Current episodes no longer show such scenes.

The show's structure is very similar to that of the American legal drama Perry Mason, though not many scenes in Ein Fall für zwei take place in a courtroom.

In October 2011, Gärtner and Frielinghaus announced that they would be leaving the series after the 300th episode, which was aired on 29 March 2013.

The series was relaunched with new characters and actors in 2014. Antoine Monot Jr. has since been playing attorney Benjamin "Benni" Hornberg alongside Wanja Mues who portrays investigator Leo Oswald.

References

External links
Series homepage on ZDF.de
An unofficial fan site, containing extensive information
Episode guide
 

German drama television series
German crime television series
1981 German television series debuts
Television shows set in Frankfurt
1990s German television series
2000s German television series
2010s German television series
German-language television shows
ZDF original programming
German legal television series